Wild Side is a 1995 erotic thriller film co-written and directed by Donald Cammell and starring Anne Heche in her first lead role, along with Christopher Walken, Joan Chen, Steven Bauer, and Allen Garfield. Cammell's final film before his suicide in April 1996, the film had a troubled production history and was initially a straight-to-video release. A director's cut reconstructed after Cammell's death was released in 2000 and was well-received by some critics. It is considered by many to be a cult film.

The film gained some notoriety for the strong lesbian sex scene between Heche and Chen featured in the unrated version, which the production company Nu Image used to market the film starting in 1997, during Anne Heche's high-profile relationship with Ellen DeGeneres.

Synopsis 
By day, Alex Lee is a California banker. By night, she moonlights as "Johanna", a high-end call girl. When she is drawn into the sordid life of infamous money launderer Bruno Buckingham, Alex must learn to safely navigate her way past Bruno's infatuation, deal with the unwanted advances of Bruno's driver Tony, and come to accept the growing attraction between herself and Virginia, Bruno's wife.

Cast (in credits order)
 Christopher Walken as Bruno Buckingham
 Joan Chen as Virginia Chow
 Steven Bauer as  Tony
 Anne Heche as Alex Lee
 Allen Garfield as Dan Rackman
 Adam Novak as Lyle Litvak
 Zion as Hiro Sakamoto
 Richard Palmer as Cop Driver
 Randy Crowder as Federal Agent
 Marcus Aurelius as Agent James Reed
 Michael Rose  as Agent Morse Jaeger
 Lewis Arquette  as  The Chief 
 Rolando de la Maza as Steward
 Candace Kita (as Candace Camille Bender) as Lotus Ita
 Philip Hamlyn as Ian Johnson
 Gena Kim as Massage Girl
 Robert Mazzola as Gilberto

Versions
There are three different versions of the film. Cammell committed suicide shortly after seeing it drastically re-edited by its producers. A "director's cut" version by Cammell's wife and co-screenwriter China Kong, and his editor and sometime producer Frank Mazzola, was released in 2000 and was noted by critics. The film is known for its graphic lesbian love scenes between stars Joan Chen and Anne Heche.  The scenes proved controversial to the point that after Wild Side's initial airings on HBO, the network subsequently chose to air a version of the film with those portions deleted.

References

External links 
 
 
 

Films directed by Donald Cammell
Nu Image films
Films scored by Ryuichi Sakamoto
1996 direct-to-video films
1990s English-language films
1990s American films
1990s erotic thriller films
American erotic thriller films
American neo-noir films
LGBT-related romantic thriller films
American LGBT-related films
1996 LGBT-related films
Lesbian-related films
Female bisexuality in film
Films about prostitution in the United States
Films set in Long Beach, California
Films shot in Los Angeles County, California